The 2015 PGA Championship was the 97th PGA Championship, held August 13–16 on the Straits Course of Whistling Straits in Kohler, Wisconsin (the course is physically in Haven but holds a Kohler mailing address due to its Kohler Company ownership). It was the third PGA Championship at Whistling Straits, which previously hosted in 2004 and 2010, as well as the United States Senior Open in 2007, all held on the Straits Course.

Jason Day won his first major championship title with a total score of 268 (−20), at the time the lowest score in relation to par ever recorded in a major (a mark since equaled by Henrik Stenson during his win at the 2016 Open Championship, Dustin Johnson at the 2020 Masters Tournament, and Cameron Smith at the 2022 Open Championship). Jordan Spieth, attempting to win his third major of the year, finished in second place three strokes behind. The second-place finish allowed Spieth to surpass Rory McIlroy as number one in the Official World Golf Ranking. Day was the fifth Australian to win the PGA Championship, the first in twenty years.

Course layout

Straits Course

Previous course lengths for major championships
  – par 72, 2010 PGA Championship
  – par 72, 2004 PGA Championship

Field
The following qualification criteria were used to select the field. Each player is listed according to the first category by which he qualified with additional categories in which he qualified shown in parentheses.

1. All former PGA Champions
Rich Beem, Keegan Bradley (8,9), Mark Brooks, John Daly, Jason Dufner, Pádraig Harrington (10), Martin Kaymer (2,9), Davis Love III, Rory McIlroy (2,4,6,8,9,10), Shaun Micheel, Phil Mickelson (4,6,8,9), Vijay Singh, David Toms, Tiger Woods, Yang Yong-eun
The following former champions did not compete: Paul Azinger, Jack Burke Jr., Steve Elkington, Dow Finsterwald, Raymond Floyd, Doug Ford, Al Geiberger, Wayne Grady, David Graham, Hubert Green, Don January, John Mahaffey, Larry Nelson, Bobby Nichols, Jack Nicklaus, Gary Player, Nick Price, Jeff Sluman, Dave Stockton, Hal Sutton, Lee Trevino, Bob Tway, Lanny Wadkins

2. Last five U.S. Open Champions
Justin Rose (8,9,10), Webb Simpson (8,9), Jordan Spieth (3,8,9,10)

3. Last five Masters Champions
Charl Schwartzel (6,8), Adam Scott (6,8), Bubba Watson (8,9,10)

4. Last five Open Champions
Darren Clarke, Ernie Els (6), Zach Johnson (8,9)

5. Current Senior PGA Champion
Colin Montgomerie

6. 15 low scorers and ties in the 2014 PGA Championship
Kevin Chappell, Jason Day (8,10), Victor Dubuisson (9), Rickie Fowler (8,9,10), Jim Furyk (8,9,10), Mikko Ilonen, Brooks Koepka (8,10), Hunter Mahan (8,9,10), Louis Oosthuizen (8), Ryan Palmer (8), Brandt Snedeker (8,10), Henrik Stenson (8,9), Steve Stricker, Jimmy Walker (8,9,10), Marc Warren, Lee Westwood (9), Bernd Wiesberger
Graham DeLaet did not play due to a thumb injury.

7. 20 low scorers in the 2015 PGA Professional National Championship
Brian Cairns, Matt Dobyns, Sean Dougherty, Charles Frost, Brian Gaffney, Ryan Helminen, Brett Jones, Ryan Kennedy, Johan Kok, Alan Morin, Jeff Olson, Austin Peters, Ben Polland, Adam Rainaud, Brent Snyder, Bob Sowards, Grant Sturgeon, Omar Uresti, Daniel Venezio, Steven Young

8. Top 70 leaders in official money standings from the 2014 WGC-Bridgestone Invitational to the 2015 Quicken Loans National
Bae Sang-moon (10), Daniel Berger, Jason Bohn, Steven Bowditch (10), Paul Casey, Brendon de Jonge, Harris English, Matt Every (10), Tony Finau, Sergio García (9), Fabián Gómez (10), Bill Haas (10), Chesson Hadley, James Hahn (10), Brian Harman, David Hearn, Russell Henley, Charley Hoffman (10), Morgan Hoffmann, J. B. Holmes (10), Billy Horschel (10), Dustin Johnson (10), Matt Jones, Kevin Kisner, Russell Knox, Matt Kuchar (9), Danny Lee (10), Marc Leishman, David Lingmerth (10), Ben Martin (10), Hideki Matsuyama, Troy Merritt (10), Ryan Moore (10), Kevin Na, Geoff Ogilvy, Scott Piercy (10), Ian Poulter (9), Patrick Reed (9,10), John Senden, Shawn Stefani, Robert Streb (10), Kevin Streelman, Justin Thomas, Brendon Todd, Cameron Tringale, Camilo Villegas (10), Nick Watney, Boo Weekley
Chris Kirk (10) and Gary Woodland (neck injury) did not play.

9. Members of the United States and European 2014 Ryder Cup teams (provided they are ranked in the top 100 in the Official World Golf Ranking on August 2, 2015)
Jamie Donaldson, Stephen Gallacher, Graeme McDowell
Thomas Bjørn (ranked 109) did not qualify, but was invited under category 12.

10. Winners of tournaments co-sponsored or approved by the PGA Tour since the 2014 PGA Championship
Alex Čejka, J. J. Henry, Shane Lowry, Nick Taylor

11. Vacancies are filled by the first available player from the list of alternates (those below 70th place in official money standings).
Charles Howell III, Pat Perez, Rory Sabbatini, Brendan Steele

12. The PGA of America reserves the right to invite additional players not included in the categories listed above
An Byeong-hun, Kiradech Aphibarnrat, Thomas Bjørn, Rafa Cabrera-Bello, Tim Clark, George Coetzee, Luke Donald, Ross Fisher, Tommy Fleetwood, Branden Grace, Emiliano Grillo, Tyrrell Hatton, David Howell, Hiroshi Iwata, Thongchai Jaidee, Miguel Ángel Jiménez, Søren Kjeldsen, Anirban Lahiri, Pablo Larrazábal, Alexander Lévy, Joost Luiten, George McNeill, Francesco Molinari, James Morrison, Koumei Oda, Eddie Pepperell, Richie Ramsay, Marcel Siem, Cameron Smith, Andy Sullivan, Danny Willett, Chris Wood
Alex Norén was invited but did not play.

Alternates (category 11)
Martin Laird – took spot reserved for WGC-Bridgestone Invitational winner
Sean O'Hair – replaced Graham DeLaet
Carl Pettersson – replaced Gary Woodland

Round summaries

First round
Thursday, August 13, 2015

Dustin Johnson recorded five birdies and an eagle and opened with a  round of 66 (−6) for a one-stroke lead. This was the third consecutive major championship in which Johnson has held at least a share of the lead after the first round. David Lingmerth birdied five out of his first seven holes on the way to a round of 67 (−5) and is a stroke behind. Defending champion Rory McIlroy, playing his first tournament since the U.S. Open after an ankle injury, opened with a round of 71 (−1), as did Masters and U.S. Open champion Jordan Spieth.

Second round
Friday, August 14, 2015
Saturday, August 15, 2015

Play was suspended at 5:28 p.m. CDT due to thunderstorms with Jason Day and Matt Jones tied for the lead at nine-under par. David Lingmerth was the clubhouse leader at seven-under. Hiroshi Iwata tied a major championship record with a round of 63 (−9), the 27th time that had been achieved in a major and 13th time at the PGA Championship.

Third round
Saturday, August 15, 2015

Following the completion of the second round on Saturday morning, the third round began at 9:15 a.m. CDT. After a round of 66 (−6), which included eight birdies and an eagle to offset a double bogey at the 15th, Jason Day built a two-stroke lead after 54 holes. Day carried at least a share of the lead into the final round for the third consecutive major championship, the first since Phil Mickelson in 2006 to do so. Jordan Spieth birdied six out of his last eight holes for a bogey-free round of 65 (−7) to move into second place. Branden Grace had the low round of the day with a 64 (−8) and jumped from 28th at the start of the round to a tie for third.

Final round
Sunday, August 16, 2015

Jason Day set a major championship scoring record on the way to a three-stroke victory and his first career major. After a round of 67 (−5) he finished the tournament at 20-under-par, breaking the previous major scoring record set by Tiger Woods at the 2000 Open Championship. Jordan Spieth, looking to join Woods and Ben Hogan with three major victories in a year, began the final round two strokes behind but was never able to close that deficit, finishing three shots behind. Spieth finished the year 54-under-par at the majors, also surpassing Woods' record from 2000. Branden Grace and Justin Rose also got to within two shots of the lead but fell from contention after double bogeys at the 10th and 13th, respectively.

Final leaderboard

Note: Top 15 and ties qualify for the 2016 PGA Championship; top 4 and ties qualify for the 2016 Masters Tournament

Scorecard
Final round

Cumulative tournament scores, relative to par

References

External links

Whistling Straits
Coverage on the European Tour's official site

PGA Championship
Golf in Wisconsin
Sports competitions in Wisconsin
PGA Championship
PGA Championship
PGA Championship
PGA Championship